Charles Leonard Davis (14 February 1884 – 27 January 1959) was an Australian politician. He was the Labor member for Port Pirie in the South Australian House of Assembly from 1947 to 1959.

He had previously been the mayor of the City of Port Pirie from 1949 to 1957.

References

 

1884 births
1959 deaths
Members of the South Australian House of Assembly
Place of birth missing
Australian Labor Party members of the Parliament of South Australia
20th-century Australian politicians